BMY-7,378 is a 5-HT1A receptor weak partial agonist/antagonist and α1D-adrenergic receptor antagonist.

References 

Phenol ethers
Phenylpiperazines
Imides